Bethel Ridge is a ridge in Greene County, New York. It is located in the Catskill Mountains east of Lawrenceville. Vedder Mountain is located northeast, and Timmerman Hill is located south of Bethel Ridge.

References

Mountains of Greene County, New York
Mountains of New York (state)